Children of Tomorrow is a 1970 science fiction novel by Canadian-American author A. E. van Vogt.

Plot summary
Commander John Lane returns from a ten-year mission in space 
to find that the teenagers of Spaceport City have organized 
themselves into "outfits", well disciplined, non-violent little gangs with their own customs and argot, and that the parent's 
role in teen upbringing has become minimal. His 16-year-old 
daughter Susan belongs to the Red Cat Outfit, whose newest member 
Bud is actually a spy for the alien fleet that has secretly followed John Lane as he returned to Earth.

External links 
 

1970 Canadian novels
1970 science fiction novels
Novels by A. E. van Vogt
Ace Books books